"New York Shit" is a song by American rapper Busta Rhymes, released July 10, 2006 as the third single from his seventh studio album The Big Bang (2006). The song, produced by American record producer DJ Scratch, contains a sample of "Faded Lady" as performed by Soul Sensation Orchestra. Additionally the song features vocals from American musician Swizz Beatz, a longtime collaborator of Busta Rhymes.

Music video
The music video for the song, directed by Benny Boom, features scenes of Busta Rhymes performing live in concert with other artists, and shows various places of New York City, including cameo appearances by fellow NYC acts such as Rakim, Q-Tip, Slick Rick and RZA, among others, as well as images of deceased artists, namely The Notorious B.I.G., Big Pun, Ol Dirty Bastard and Jam Master Jay.

Remixes
Roll My Shit by Curren$y
A.D.D. Pt.2 by Wale
New Jerz Shit (Remix) by Joe Budden
Return of the Mac (aka New York Shit) by Prodigy
New York Shit (Marley Marl Remix) (featuring KRS-One)
New York Shit (Freestyle) - Mashonda
New York Shit (Remix) (featuring Swizz Beatz, Nas, Papoose, Labba and M.O.P.)
Down South Shit (featuring Slim Thug, Three 6 Mafia and Rick Ross)
Dade County Shit (featuring Pitbull, Smitty & C-Ride)
L.A. Shit - Jay Rock (Feat. Kendrick Lamar)
BK Shit- Gravy & A-Smash
New York Shit (Legend Remix) (featuring Rakim, DMX and Jadakiss) (Unofficial, it consists in verses from other songs, like The Watcher)
H-Town Shit - Brooke Valentine feat. Bun B
Pyrelli - London Shit
Midwest Shit  (featuring Kanye West, Lupe Fiasco, Common & Twista)
New York Shit (Freestyle) - Hi-Tek
New York Shit (Featuring Jean Grae & Talib Kweli)
LIve My LIfe (featuring StarRJ The Feenom & Lo)
Tokyo Shit - Kashi Da Handsome
Manchester Shit - Broke'n'English
P.A. Shit - Freeway
JA Shit - The Bulletproof Army
Rick Ross - Miami Shit

Charts

References

2006 singles
Busta Rhymes songs
Swizz Beatz songs
Music videos directed by Benny Boom
Songs about New York City
Songs written by Swizz Beatz
Aftermath Entertainment singles
Interscope Records singles
New York City hip hop